Charles-Louis Havas (5 July 1783 – 21 May 1858) was a French writer, translator, and founder of the first news agency Agence Havas (whose descendants are the Agence France-Presse (AFP) and the advertising firm Havas).

Biography
Havas was born to a Jewish family in Rouen. In 1835, he founded the Agence Havas, aware of their growing interest in international affairs, translated foreign newspapers and then sold them to the French national press, local businessman, and the government. Recognizing that newspapers were not always accurate and often biased, he explored the concept of having his own correspondents in the field who would supply his agency with information. He died at Bougival.

Two of his employees, Paul Reuter and Bernhard Wolff, later set up rival news agencies in London (the Reuters News Agency founded in 1851) and Berlin (the Wolffs Telegraphisches Bureau founded in 1849) respectively. In order to reduce overhead and develop the lucrative advertising side of the business, Havas's sons, who had succeeded him in 1852, signed agreements with Reuter and Wolff, giving each news agency an exclusive reporting zone in different parts of Europe. This arrangement lasted until the 1930s, when the invention of short-wave wireless improved and cut communications costs. To help Havas extend the scope of its reporting at a time of great international tension, the French government financed up to 47% of its investments.

References

See also 
Charles-Louis Havas (French)

French journalists
19th-century French Jews
News agency founders
1783 births
1858 deaths
French male non-fiction writers
Writers from Rouen